Zerfas may refer to:

Zerfas (band), of the Zerfas brothers
Zerfas (album) 1973

See also
Zerfaß